José Amin Daher Neto (20 April 1966 – 13 January 2014), known as José Daher, was a professional tennis player from Brazil.

Biography
Daher was born in São Paulo on 20 April 1966 and grew up in Barretos, a city in the north of the state.

Career
Daher, a right-hander, played his first professional tournament in 1983. During the 1980s he was a member of Brazil's Davis Cup squad on multiple occasions, however he didn't ever appear in a fixture. 

When Andre Agassi won his first career title at Itaparica in 1987, Daher was the only one of his opponents to win a set against him. He featured in the main draw at 12 Grand Prix/ATP Tour tournaments in total, most of them in his native country, from which he made the second round four times, with his victories coming against Alberto Tous, Vicente Solves, William Kyriakos and Gabriel Markus. In 1988 he reached his highest ranking, 139th in the world. 

He qualified for the main draw of the men's doubles at the 1989 Wimbledon Championships, with Fernando Roese. The pair had a straight sets win over Eddie Edwards and Greg Holmes in the first round, then lost in the second round to the fourth seeds Jim Grabb and Patrick McEnroe, but did manage to take a set off the American pairing.

At Challenger level he won three doubles titles and had a win over Guillermo Vilas at a São Paulo Challenger in 1991.

He founded the "Daher Tennis Lounge", a tennis centre in São José dos Campos.

Death
Daher died in a road accident on the Rio-Santos highway at the age of 47. On the morning of 13 January 2014 he was travelling near Paraty when his car swerved into a lane of incoming traffic and crashed into a tour bus. He was returning home from a weekend in Angra dos Reis.

Challenger titles

Doubles: (3)

References

External links
 
 

1966 births
2014 deaths
Brazilian male tennis players
Tennis players from São Paulo
Road incident deaths in Brazil
People from Barretos